"Ça va ça va" is a song by French singer Claudio Capéo. The song was released as a digital download in France on 28 September 2016 by Jo & Co as the second single from his third studio album Claudio Capéo.. The song was written by Manon Romiti, Silvio Lisbonne, Nazim Khaled and Eddy Pradelles. The song peaked at number 23 on the French Singles Chart.

Music video
A video to accompany the release of "Ça va ça va" was first released onto YouTube on 28 September 2016 at a total length of three minutes and nineteen seconds. The video was directed by Hobo & Mojo.

Track listing

Charts

Weekly charts

Year-end charts

Release history

References

2016 singles
2016 songs
Songs written by Silvio Lisbonne
Songs written by Nazim Khaled
Songs written by Manon Romiti